Ribollita is a  Tuscan bread soup, panade, porridge, or potage made with bread and vegetables, often from leftovers. There are many variations but the main ingredients always include leftover bread, cannellini beans, lacinato kale, cabbage, and inexpensive vegetables such as carrot, beans, chard, celery, potatoes, and onion. Its name means "reboiled". It is often baked in a clay pot.

Like most Tuscan cuisine, the soup has peasant origins. It was originally made by reheating (or reboiling) the leftover minestrone or vegetable soup from the previous day with stale bread. 

Some sources date it back to the Middle Ages when the servants gathered up food-soaked bread trenchers from feudal lords' banquets and boiled them for their dinners.

History 
It is a typical "poor" dish of peasant origin, whose name derives from the fact that the peasants cooked a large quantity of it (especially on Fridays, being a lean dish) and then "boiled" it in a pan in the following days (hence "ribollita"), because the real soup is heated twice, otherwise it would be a very banal soup of bread and vegetables (therefore not to be confused with bread soup).

The first traces of this preparation date back to 1910 in the book L'arte cucinaria in Italia by Alberto Cougnet.

See also
 Acquacotta
 Pappa al pomodoro
 List of Italian soups
 List of vegetable soups
List of bread dishes

Notes

External links
 Ribollita recipe 

Italian soups
Cuisine of Tuscany
Bread soups
Peasant food